This list of Stratemeyer Syndicate series gives the titles of all series produced by the book-packaging firm the Stratemeyer Syndicate. The Syndicate was founded by Edward Stratemeyer and is best known for producing the Bobbsey Twins, Hardy Boys, Nancy Drew, Rover Boys, and Tom Swift series. The Syndicate produced these and many other series in assembly-line fashion: one person wrote the outline for a story or series of stories, another wrote the story itself, and often still another edited the work. Most Syndicate books were published under pseudonyms. The authors named in this list are those credited as having written the series; in most cases, the names are fictitious.

The Syndicate was founded in 1905. However, Edward Stratemeyer was writing series books and outlines and hiring ghostwriters before the Syndicate's incorporation; his Rover Boys series, first published in 1899 under the name Arthur M. Winfield, is sometimes considered the first Stratemeyer Syndicate series. For this reason, the list includes series beginning in 1899 with the Rover Boys. Series production was overseen by Edward Stratemeyer until his death in 1930, whereupon his daughter, Harriet Stratemeyer Adams oversaw the firm until her death in 1982. Nancy Axelrad briefly took the helm before selling the Syndicate and the rights to all its series to Simon & Schuster in 1984, which hired a different book-packager, Mega-Books, to handle future titles. Series begun in or before 1984 are therefore included in this list, but not series begun after the Syndicate's sale.

Not included in this list are proposed series, such as a Hardy Boys spin-off series featuring Chet Morton or unpublished titles. Also not included are series such as the Judy Bolton Series, the Cherry Ames Nurse Stories, or the Trixie Belden Mysteries, as these were not produced by the Syndicate.

Unless otherwise noted, information is taken from Deidre Johnson's Stratemeyer Pseudonyms and Series Books. Dates given are those of original publication, followed, if applicable, by dates of re-issue.

Series

Notes

References

 
 
  
 
 
 
 
  
 
 
 
 
 
 
 
 

Juvenile series
Nancy Drew
Series of books
Series of children's books